p-Hydroxynorephedrine (PHN), or 4-hydroxynorephedrine, is the para-hydroxy analog of norephedrine and an active sympathomimetic metabolite of amphetamine in humans.  When it occurs as a metabolite of amphetamine, it is produced from both p-hydroxyamphetamine and norephedrine.

Amphetamine metabolism

Notes

See also
Hydroxynorephedrine

References

References

External links 

 

Amphetamine
Phenylethanolamines
Sympathomimetics
Substituted amphetamines